"God Bless the Prince of Wales" is a patriotic song written to mark the occasion of the marriage of the future King Edward VII to Alexandra of Denmark.

The song was first proposed at the Caernarfon Eisteddfod of 1862.  The words were written by the poet, John Ceiriog Hughes and the music by Henry Brinley Richards.

Ar D'wysog gwlad y bryniau, 
O boed i'r nefoedd wen, 
Roi iddo gyda choron, 
Ei bendith ar ei ben!

Pan syrthio'r aur wialen,
Pan elo un i'r nef,
Y nef a ddalio i fyny
Ei law frenhinol ef!

The English words are by George Linley.  The song was completed and performed in 1863. The opening lyrics are:

Among our ancient mountains,
And from our lovely vales,
Oh! Let the prayer re-echo
God bless the Prince of Wales!

With hearts and voice awaken
Those minstrel strains of yore,
Till Britain's name and glory,
Resounds from shore to shore.

In parts of Scotland and Ireland the tune is used to sing "Derry's Walls", a unionist song.

References

External links
Full lyrics

Welsh songs
Welsh patriotic songs
1862 songs
Princes of Wales